"Chrysalis Heart" is the third single from Delerium's album Music Box Opera featuring Stef Lang.

Remixes were made by Sterojackers vs. Mark Loverush, Ido and Sleepthief.

A music video was directed by Jose Ho-Guanipa. with cinematography by Brad Rushing and editing by David Blackburn.
In the video, a love triangle is seen through split-screens, where the two girls plan to kill the guy.

Track listing
 Digital Release - 2013
 "Chrysalis Heart (Stereojackers vs Mark Loverush Remix)" - 7:32
 "Chrysalis Heart (Ido Remix)" - 5:16
 "Chrysalis Heart (Sleepthief Remix)" - 4:14
 "Chrysalis Heart (Original Mix)" - 3:49
 "Chrysalis Heart (Stereojackers vs Mark Loverush Edit)" - 3:27
 "Chrysalis Heart (Stereojackers vs Mark Loverush Dub)" - 7:32

References

Delerium songs
2013 singles
2012 songs
Songs written by Bill Leeb
Nettwerk Records singles
Songs written by Rhys Fulber
Songs written by Troy Samson